The 1970 Pepsi-Cola Masters was a tennis tournament played on indoor carpet courts at the Tokyo Metropolitan Gymnasium in Tokyo, Japan. It was the first edition of the year-end Masters Grand Prix and was held from December 9 through December 15, 1970. The event included a singles and doubles draw, both of which were held in a round robin format. Stan Smith won the first singles title and then partnered Arthur Ashe to the doubles title as well.

The best six players from the 1970 Grand Prix circuit ranking qualified for the singles event. Cliff Richey, the winner of the Grand Prix ranking, could not participate due to illness. John Newcombe was the first replacement as the number seven ranked but was unable to play which meant that Jan Kodeš, ranked eight, completed the field. Stan Smith won the singles title in the round robin format and earned $15,000 first-prize money.

Finals

Singles

 Stan Smith won a round robin competition also featuring  Arthur Ashe,  Željko Franulović,  Jan Kodeš,  Rod Laver and  Ken Rosewall.
 It was Smith's 6th title of the year and the 9th of his career.

Doubles

 Arthur Ashe /  Stan Smith won a round robin competition against the teams of  Jan Kodeš /  Rod Laver and  Željko Franulović /  Ken Rosewall.
 It was Ashe's 6th title of the year and the 7th of his professional career. It was Smith's 7th title of the year and the 10th of his career.

References

External links
 ATP Singles results

 

Grand Prix tennis circuit year-end championships
1970 in Japanese tennis
Tennis tournaments in Japan
1970 in Tokyo